Guy Chevrette (born January 10, 1940 in Saint-Come, Quebec) served as Parti Québécois leader of the Opposition in the National Assembly of Quebec, Canada, from 1987 to 1989. He was the MNA for the riding of Joliette-Montcalm from 1976 to 1981 and Joliette from 1981 to 2002.

Biography 

When former Premier Pierre-Marc Johnson quit politics in 1987 after losing the 1985 election, Chevrette became Leader of the Opposition. In 1988, the PQ elected a new leader, Jacques Parizeau, however Parizeau was not sitting in the National Assembly since he had resigned in 1984.

In the 1989 election, Parizeau won a seat and replaced Chevrette as Leader of the Opposition.

After the PQ won the 1994 election, Chevrette served in various ministerial posts in the cabinet in the governments of Parizeau, Lucien Bouchard and Bernard Landry.  He resigned and quit politics in 2002.

In 2003, he founded a lobbying firm with longtime chief of staff Pierre Chateauvert.  In 2005, he was appointed executive officer of the Quebec Forest Council, a private association defending the forestry industry.

See also
Politics of Quebec
List of Quebec general elections
List of Quebec leaders of the Opposition
Timeline of Quebec history

External links

1940 births
Living people
Parti Québécois MNAs
21st-century Canadian politicians